Bhowanipore (also Bhowanipur) is a neighbourhood of South Kolkata in Kolkata district of West Bengal, India.

History
In 1717, the East India Company obtained the right to rent from 38 villages surrounding their settlement from the Mughal emperor Farrukhsiyar. Of these, 5 lay across the Hooghly in what is now Howrah district. The remaining 33 villages were on the Calcutta side.  After the fall of Siraj-ud-daulah, the last independent Nawab of Bengal, it purchased these villages in 1758 from Mir Jafar, and reorganised them. These villages were known en-bloc as Dihi Panchannagram and Bhowanipore was one of them. It was considered to be a suburb beyond the limits of the Maratha Ditch.

Bhowanipore existed as a dihi in 1765 and also absorbed a part of Dihi Chakraberia. The construction of Harish Mukherjee Road and Lansdowne Road (now Sarat Bose Road) and the extension of Hazra Road to Kalighat, opened up the area at the beginning of the 20th century. Artisans played a role in developing the neighbourhood and making it a populous native place. The kansaris (braziers), the shankharis (conch workers) and the telis (oil pressers); all had their paras. The goods were sold in pattis. Along with these artisans, Indian lawyers flocked to Bhowanipore, as the Sadr Diwani Adalat, the highest appellate court in those days, had shifted to the old Military Hospital Building here, and the District Judge's court was in Alipore.

In 1888, one of the 25 newly organized police section houses was located in Bhowanipore.

When the Bengal Renaissance started taking roots in 19th century Calcutta, it was initially limited to the predominantly Hindu 'Indian town' stretching north and north-east from the fringes of Burrabazar, with a somewhat later extension to south and south-east of the 'European town' to Bhowanipore, and some decades later to Ballygunge, which was then developing as a suburb.

In the first half of the 20th century, “in the milieu of relative urban prosperity... Calcutta’s rich citizens – those connected with jute, coal, tea, other industries, trade, money-lending and rentier income from urban property – did fabulously well for themselves.” Many of the mansions in Ballygunge, Bhowanipore and Alipore were built by the city's Bengali and the new Marwari elite who wanted to move from the “dirtier sections of north Calcutta to the more fashionable areas in the south”.

Again, it was in the first half of the 20th century that with the implementation of the Area Improvement Programme of Calcutta Improvement Trust Bhowanipore, an old residential suburb was upgraded to modern standards of town planning.

Notable residents

Subhas Chandra Bose, one of the frontline Freedom Fighters of British India, founder of the Forward Bloc and the Indian National Army
Hemant Kumar, famous singer, composer,  director and producer, lived near Kansari Para in his youth and attended Mitra Institution school of Bhowanipore area.
Uttam Kumar, Matinee Idol, Mahanayak, the first person to be awarded a National Award for Acting, Director, Producer, Singer, and Composer. Immortal Hero of Bengali Movies
Anil Kumar Gain, a prominent mathematician from the University of Cambridge, Fellow of the Royal Society
Satyajit Ray, world-renowned film-maker, composer and author
Guru Dutt, renowned Indian film director, producer, actor, choreographer, and writer
Deshbandhu Chittaranjan Das, renowned barrister and president of Swaraj Party
Brajendranath De, commissioner of Burdwan
Tarun Kumar, Versatile Actor, Brother of Uttam Kumar
Ashutosh Mukherjee, vice-chancellor of the University of Calcutta
Shyama Prasad Mukherjee, founder of Jan Sangh and first union industry minister of India
Premendra Mitra, Author and Poet
Siddhartha Shankar Ray, former Chief Minister of West Bengal, Barrister
Bijon Bhattacharya, eminent theatre artist, director and famous Bengali play writer, also the husband of eminent international award-winning social worker and writer Smt.Mahasweta Devi.
Ranjit Mallick, Bengali film actor.
Hana Catherine Mullens (1826–1861), European missionary, educator, translator and writer, notable for zenana missions
Alphonse François Lacroix, missionary and translator 
Munna Mitra, first-class cricketer and Anglican clergyman

Geography

Location
It is located south of the Lower Circular Road (now A.J.C. Bose Road). It is bounded by Lansdown Road (presently Sarat Bose Road) to the east, Hazra Road to the south and Tolly Nullah to the west. It consists of well-known and posh localities like Elgin Road, Gokhale Road, Woodburn Park, Bakulbagan Road, Harish Mukherjee Road, Townshend Road and parts of Chakraberia and Lansdowne.

Police district
Bhowanipur police station is part of the South division of Kolkata Police.

Tollygunge Women's police station has jurisdiction over all the police districts in the South Division, i.e. Park Street, Shakespeare Sarani, Alipore, Hastings, Maidan, Bhowanipore, Kalighat, Tollygunge, Charu Market, New Alipur and Chetla.

Places of interest

 Forum Mall, Elgin Road

Demographics
Business opportunities brought many Gujaratis to Calcutta about a century back and they opted to stay in the Lansdowne-Chakraberia-Puddapukur belt of Bhowanipore. The railways, the jute mills and the shipping industry brought in many Punjabis to Calcutta. The Harish Mukherjee Road area of Bhowanipore and Dunlop (in north Kolkata) were the biggest pockets of Punjabi settlement. With declining economic opportunities many of both the communities are leaving Kolkata. Writing about the Bhabanipur (Vidhan Sabha constituency), from where the West Bengal chief minister, Mamata Banerjee, contests, Hindustan Times said, "The constituency has a sizable population of Sikhs and Gujaratis. However, it is dominated by middle-class Bengalis."

For language and religion census data, available at the district level, see Kolkata district.

Culture
Bhowanipore was also known as the Cinema Para, or the locality of the city which boasted of a string of cinema halls. The stretch started with Purna near Jadu Babu's Bazaar and was followed up by Bharati, Indira, Bijoli, Basusree, Kalika, and Ujjwala, right up to the recesses of the Kalighat Temple. They were primarily famous for their screenings of Bengali, English and Hindi movies. However, due to the lack of patronage and drying up of the Bengali film box office in the mid-90s, and the first decade of the 2000s, most of these halls have been closed down. Basusree, Indira and Bijoli are still operational, though the condition is not that well of, Bharati, Kalika, and Ujjwala have been demolished to make way for multi-storied buildings that host malls, educational institutes, and marriage halls. Purna has been closed down for more than a decade now, and there is little hope that it will be opened again.

The area also has the 23 Palli Durga Mandir, a small Temple which houses an Ashta Dhaatu Murti of Durga, and near the well known Kalighat Kali Temple, and the Nakuleshwar Bhairav Temple, considered one of the holiest of the holies in Hindu religion.

Healthcare

 Chittaranjan National Cancer Institute
 SSKM Hospital
 Sambhunath Pandit Hospital
 Health Point Hospital

Education
 Asutosh College, S. P. Mukherjee Road
 Hartley High School, Sarat Bose Road
 Acharya Jagadish Chandra Bose College, Elgin Road
 Bhawanipur Education Society College, Elgin Road
 Bhawanipur Gujarati Balmandir
 J. J. Ajmera High School, Heysham Road
 Julien Day School, Elgin Road and Ramesh Mitra Road.
 St. John's Diocesan Girls' Higher Secondary School
 Cathedral Mission High School, Elgin Road
 South Calcutta Girls' College
 IPGME&R and SSKM Hospital, Acharya Jagadish Chandra Bose Road

Sports
A club named Bhawanipore FC, founded by Nani Mitra in 1910, stands at the entrance of the Maidan near the Rani Rashmani Statue and presently managed by the Sangbad Pratidin group, represents Bhawanipore in both the domestic and regional tournaments. The club is two time runners-up in the I-League 2nd Division in 2014–15 and 2019–20.

References

External links

 Neighbourhoods in Kolkata